Doddakurugodu is a village in the southern state of Karnataka, India. It is located in the Gauribidanur taluk of Chikkaballapura district in Karnataka. It is situated 9 km away from sub-district headquarter Gauribidanur and 43 km away from district headquarter Chikkaballapura.

Demographics
According to Census 2011 information the location code or village code of Gedare village is 623235.  Doddakurugodu village is also a gram panchayat. Villages comes under Doddakurugodu gram Panchayat are 
Yarrahalli, Malenahalli, Kudumalakunte, H. Nagasandra and Doddakuragodu.

The total geographical area of village is 646.26 hectares. Doddakuragodu has a total population of 3,189 peoples with 1,298 males and 1,327 females. There are about 596 houses in Doddakuragodu village. Gauribidanur is nearest town to Doddakuragodu which is approximately 9 km away.

Economy
People belonging to the Doddakurugodu village grow very much maize, millet silk, etc. The major occupations of the residents of Doddakurugodu  are dairy farming. The dairy cooperative is the largest individual milk supplying cooperative in the state.

Facilities
Doddakurugodu has below types of facilities.

 Anganawadi Center
 Government higher primary School
 Government high school
 Doddakurugodu KMF (Karnataka Milk Federation) Dairy
 Gram Panchayat Office
 Post Office

Temples 
 Ganesha Temple
 Obalamma Temple
 Chowdeshwari temple
 Anjaneya Temple

See also
Kurudi, Gauribidanur

References

External links
 https://chikkaballapur.nic.in/en/

Villages in Chikkaballapur district